The German term Bürgerblock-Regierung (English: bourgeois bloc administration) denotes a government coalition in the German Weimar Republic. It consisted of the German Democratic Party, Zentrum, the Bavarian People's Party, the German People's Party and the German National People's Party (or at least most of these parties).

On 15. January 1925 the first occurrence of this coalition (led by Hans Luther) came into effect. On 29. January 1927 Wilhelm Marx's cabinet brought the second occurrence of such a combination.

In the Federal Republic of Germany  CDU/CSU/FDP coalitions are sometimes (rarely) referred to with this term. The usual denotation today is "centre-right government" or “bourgeois government” (in German "bürgerliche Regierung"), because the SPD is not part of this combination.

See also 
 Centre Party (Germany)

References 

Coalition governments
Politics of the Weimar Republic